Emery paper is a type of abrasive paper or sandpaper, that can be used to abrade (remove material from) surfaces or mechanically finish a surface. Operations include deburring, polishing, paint removal, corrosion removal, sizing, etc. This is accomplished by rubbing the abrasive-coated paper, with some pressure, against the object being processed. Abrasion may be performed by hand, electrically powered, or air powered equipment.

Description
Emery is a naturally occurring rock of impure crystalline aluminium oxide (Al2O3 mixed with oxides of silicon (e.g. SiO2), iron (Fe), and other elements and varying small percentages of clay and other silicates for example: kaolinite (Al4Si4O10(OH)8)). Smaller particles abrade smaller amounts of material and are used to produce a finer finish.

By the successive use of progressively finer mesh emery paper, near-mirror finishes can be obtained. Water or oil is often used as a lubricant and to float the abrasive debris and worn abrasive away from the work, preventing the build-up of debris in the emery paper. The paper will lose effectiveness if too much debris builds up, a condition known as "clogging", or "loading".

Originally, emery paper was made from milled emery rock, bonded or sized to paper often with an animal glue for water resistance. Today, synthetic adhesives are used in place of natural glues and silicon carbide (SiC) is often substituted for emery, silicon carbide being slightly harder, and more durable with less tendency to fracture than corundum. The use of natural emery papers is rare today generally being replaced with silicon carbide or pure aluminium oxide papers.

Other uses 
Emery cloth has the abrasives bonded to a fabric instead of a paper. The cloth is more tear resistant, flexible, and costly. Emery boards have applications similar to emery paper or cloth.

It also has a use in modelling. For 00 scale modelling, the fine grades of emery paper can have the appearance of a tarmac surface.

References 

Grinding and lapping
Coated abrasives
Paper products